Vishnu is an Indian television actor. After making a breakthrough as an actor through his role in Office (2013), he has worked on films including Mapla Singam (2016) Ivan Yarendru Therikiratha (2017) and  Kalari (2018). He is now currently playing a lead role of Prabhu in the prime time serial Sathya on Zee Tamil.And also parallelly, he is doing a lead role of Arjun in the prime time hit serial  Idhu Solla Marandha Kadhai (TV series) on Colors Tamil along with Rachitha Mahalakshmi.

Career
He made his breakthrough as an actor with his role as Vishnuvardhan in the television series, Office, co-starring Karthik and Shruthi Raj. Vishnu made his debut as an actor in films through supporting roles in Mapla Singam (2016), an action film starring Vemal and Anjali. His first film as the lead actor, Ivan Yarendru Therikiratha (2017), had a delayed release and failed to garner attention at the box office as a result of other high-profile releases. The film was a comedy about a man who was born on Valentine's Day finding it difficult to get a lover, and saw him appear alongside actresses Ishaara Nair and Varsha Bollamma.

His forthcoming releases are Kalari alongside actor Kreshna and Sivappu Seval, in both of which he portrays negative roles.

Filmography

Television

Guest Appearance

Films

Award and nominations

References

External links

Living people
Tamil male actors
Tamil male television actors
Television personalities from Tamil Nadu
Male actors from Tamil Nadu
Male actors in Tamil cinema
21st-century Tamil male actors
1985 births